The 2019 New South Wales state election was held on Saturday 23 March 2019 to elect the 57th Parliament of New South Wales, including all 93 seats in the Legislative Assembly and 21 of the 42 seats in the Legislative Council. The election was conducted by the New South Wales Electoral Commission (NSWEC).

The two-term incumbent Liberal/National Coalition Government led by Premier Gladys Berejiklian and Deputy Premier John Barilaro was re-elected to a third four-year term with a reduced majority in the Legislative Assembly, where government is formed. The main Opposition Labor Party under Michael Daley won an increased share of the vote in most districts, though the party was unable to successfully gain support in key marginal electorates. Minor parties the Greens and the Shooters, Fishers and Farmers Party, as well as several independent MPs, also contested the election.

ABC election analyst Antony Green called the election for the Coalition at about 8:15pm, over two hours after the 6:00pm close of polling booths. However, it took a further two full days of official vote counting by the electoral commission before the ABC election computer was able to project that the Coalition had retained majority government. Ultimately, the Coalition won 48 seats (35 Liberal, 13 National), suffering a loss of six seats from the 2015 election, providing the incumbent government with a slim two-seat majority. The Labor Party won 36 seats, an increase of two seats. Labor, and to a larger extent the Coalition, both suffered primary vote swings against them. Minor parties the Greens and the Shooters, Fishers and Farmers each won three seats, and they were joined on the crossbench by three independents.

In the Legislative Council, 21 seats were up for election. The Coalition won eight seats, Labor seven, the Greens and One Nation each picked up two seats, whilst the Shooters, Fishers and Farmers Party and Animal Justice Party claimed one seat each. One Nation's lead candidate Mark Latham, who led the Labor Party to defeat at the 2004 federal election, was elected to the Council. In total the Coalition held 17 seats, Labor 14 and crossbenchers of other parties held 11. The result left the Berejiklian Government needing at least five votes to pass legislation, up from the two they needed in the previous Council.

It was the first time that the Coalition won a third consecutive term in office in New South Wales since the 1971 state election. Berejiklian became the first woman to lead a party to a state election victory in New South Wales, as well as the third woman to lead a party to a victory at a state election in Australia (after Queensland's Anna Bligh and Annastacia Palaszczuk) and the first non-Labor woman to do so.

Daley had initially indicated that he would stay on as leader despite the loss. However, facing the prospect of a leadership spill, Daley announced several days after the election that he would stand down as leader and not contest a subsequent leadership election, to be held after the federal election in May. Deputy leader Penny Sharpe served as interim leader of the party in the intervening period. That leadership election was subsequently held, and Strathfield MP Jodi McKay was elected as Labor Party Leader, against Kogarah MP Chris Minns.

New South Wales has compulsory voting, with optional preferential voting in single-member seats for the lower house and single transferable vote with optional preferential above-the-line voting in the proportionally represented upper house.

Results

Legislative Assembly 

Compared with results from 2015 election.

Post-election pendulum

Legislative Council

Background

Lower house and by-elections

At the 2015 election, the Coalition retained government with a reduced majority of 54 seats from 69 seats in the 2011 election. In the course of the previous parliamentary term, the Coalition had been reduced to 61 seats due to ICAC proceedings that resulted in the departure of eight MPs from the Liberal Party. The Labor Party gained 11 seats at the election, for a total of 34 seats. The Greens gained a record three seats whilst independents Greg Piper and Alex Greenwich both retained their seats.

Several by-elections were held after the 2015 election. In most of these, the party holding the seat did not change. There were two exceptions to this. In the 2016 Orange by-election, Philip Donato of the Shooters, Fishers and Farmers Party won the seat, previously held by the Nationals. In the 2018 Wagga Wagga by-election, independent candidate Joe McGirr won the seat, previously held by the Liberal Party.

Upper house
The 2015 election saw the incumbent Liberal/National coalition gain one seat in the Legislative Council to have a total of 20 seats, despite a 5.1-point swing against them. The Labor Party lost two seats, bringing their total down to 12; the Greens, Shooters and Fishers, and Christian Democrats saw no gains or losses in the election: these parties won five seats, two seats and two seats, respectively. The only gain came from the Animal Justice Party.

Campaign

The Liberal Party campaign was launched by Premier Gladys Berejiklian on 10 March. The event was attended by Prime Minister Scott Morrison, former Prime Minister John Howard, and former New South Wales Premiers Mike Baird, Barry O'Farrell, John Fahey, and Nick Greiner. Berejiklian announced that, if re-elected, the government would spend $2 billion over four years to construct two new metro rail lines: one from the Sydney CBD to Parramatta and one from St Marys station to the planned Western Sydney Airport. She also pledged to build or upgrade 29 hospitals and clinics state-wide, including redevelopments of the Bankstown Lidcombe Hospital and John Hunter Hospital at a cost of $1.3 billion and $780 million, respectively. Another $917 million was pledged for the construction of eight new schools and the upgrade of 31 others. Another $120 million is to be spent expanding before and after school care to "ensure that every public primary school student in NSW can access before and after school care from 7 am to 6 pm."

The Labor Party campaign was launched by Opposition Leader Michael Daley on 10 March. The event was attended by federal Labor leader and Leader of the Opposition Bill Shorten, as well as former New South Wales Premiers Kristina Keneally, Bob Carr, and Barrie Unsworth. Daley committed to spending $2.7 billion over ten years to fund public schools, recruiting 5,000 new teachers and aiming to make New South Wales the first state to commit to the Gonski school funding model. $250 million was pledged in funding for mental health care, with Daley stating that Labor will hire more nurses in mental health wards and introduce nurse-to-patient ratios. Labor also committed to banning conversion therapy and decriminalization of abortion and also to have abortion performed within public hospitals if elected. A $1 billion water fund was announced for the purpose of upgrading water infrastructure and protecting the water supply of regional communities, particularly in times of drought.

On 19 March, a September 2018 video surfaced in which opposition leader Daley made negative comments about Asian immigration in Sydney: "Our young children will flee and who are they being replaced with? They are being replaced by young people from typically Asia with PhDs... So there's a transformation happening in Sydney now where our kids are moving out and foreigners are moving in and taking their jobs." Daley apologised for his comments, stating "What I was referring to was housing affordability in Sydney ... I could've expressed myself better, no offence was meant." Despite the apology after the video's release the controversy dogged Mr Daley and Labor until the end of the campaign. The video is suggested to have ultimately cost Labor potential victory in a number of key seats in Sydney with large proportions of voters from Asian backgrounds, and was also likely held back until it would be politically most beneficial to the incumbent government.

Labor's preference deals with the Shooters, Fishers and Farmers Party was criticised by Premier Berejiklian, who suggested that a Labor government supported by the Shooters could lead to looser gun laws. Daley responded by pledging to resign from parliament if gun laws were changed, even if the measures were passed by the Coalition.

In light of the National Party's preference deal with the Liberal Democrats, Labor leader Daley accused Berejiklian of hypocrisy for criticising Labor's preference deals with the Shooters Party while her own coalition partner offered preferences to the Liberal Democrats, whose platform includes even more extreme positions on gun laws than the Shooters. Berejiklian stated that the deal was not comparable as it only concerned the upper house, and would not affect government formation, which occurs in the lower house.

Issues
The incumbent Liberal government planned to continue with the demolition of the Sydney Football Stadium and, if re-elected, to replace it with a new $730 million venue. The Labor Party oppose the demolition. The issue was thrust into the limelight by Peter FitzSimons, a local media figure, who remarked that he believed that the Government would not win the election unless they cancelled the stadium rebuild. Michael Daley seized on the apparent popularity of the anti-stadium movement to call the election a "referendum on stadiums", as well as touring a "campaign bus" with the slogan "Schools & Hospitals Before Stadiums" on the side.

On 9 March, Labor unveiled its plan for a "war on waste", seeking to ban single-use plastic bags, phase out single-use plastic, and reduce waste and create jobs by investing $140 million in recycling initiatives.

Pauline Hanson's One Nation under the leadership of Mark Latham ran on a platform which opposed immigration, congestion, overdevelopment and renewable power, and proposed DNA tests for Aboriginal welfare recipients and banning the burqa in government buildings.

Debates
The first debate of the campaign was held on 8 March on the ABC. It featured Premier Gladys Berejiklian and Opposition Leader Michael Daley, and was moderated by Brigid Glanville. Subjects discussed included the demolition of the Sydney Football Stadium, cost of living in Sydney, transportation, infrastructure, and the Murray–Darling basin. In their final remarks, Berejiklian pledged to continue the current course and finish pending projects, while Daley emphasised his commitment to regional voters and promised assistance for dairy farmers.

A second debate was held on 20 March on Sky News featuring Premier Gladys Berejiklian and Opposition Leader Michael Daley, moderated by David Speers. An audience of 100 undecided voters asked questions to the two leaders. Issues discussed included stadium funding, climate change, domestic violence, TAFE funding, the M4 motorway toll. When questioned on Labor's planned TAFE funding increase, Daley struggled to provide a precise figure before openly blurting out a figure of $3 billion, which drew laughter from the audience and an immediate "No!" from the Premier. The actual figure was only $74 million. Berejiklian was also unable to clarify whether motorists would be charged a toll to travel on the M4 from Parramatta to Penrith. The audience were subsequently asked who they were more inclined to vote for after the debate. 50 favoured Berejiklian, while 25 favoured Daley; a further 25 were undecided.

Preferences
In February 2019, it was reported that Shooters, Fishers and Farmers Party and Pauline Hanson's One Nation sent preferences each other's way in the upper house.

Labor leader Michael Daley said the party's head office, instead of the leader's, would decide preference deals on a "seat-by-seat basis". While refusing to rule out Labor dealing with the Shooters, Fishers and Farmers, Daley said Labor would not accept a preference deal with One Nation "because they are a racist party".

The National Party made preference deals with the Liberal Democrats and Christian Democratic Party in the Legislative Council, suggesting that voters give them second and third preferences respectively.

Registered parties
18 parties were registered with the New South Wales Electoral Commission (NSWEC). All eighteen parties nominated candidates for election to the Legislative Council.

 Advance Australia Party
 Animal Justice Party
 Australian Conservatives
 Australian Labor Party
 Christian Democratic Party (Fred Nile Group)
 Country Labor Party
 Flux Party
 Greens NSW
 Keep Sydney Open

 Liberal Democratic Party
 Liberal Party of Australia
 National Party of Australia
 Pauline Hanson's One Nation
 Shooters, Fishers and Farmers Party
 Small Business Party
 Socialist Alliance
 Sustainable Australia 
 Voluntary Euthanasia Party

Retiring MPs 
The seat of Wollondilly was vacated following the resignation of Liberal MP Jai Rowell on 17 December 2018.

Members who chose not to renominate for the 2019 election were as follows:

Labor
Luke Foley MP (Auburn) – announced 9 November 2018
Ernest Wong MLC – lost preselection 12 June 2018

Liberal
Greg Aplin MP (Albury) – announced 1 August 2018
Glenn Brookes MP (East Hills) – announced 4 August 2018
Pru Goward MP (Goulburn) – announced 19 December 2018
Chris Patterson MP (Camden) – announced 28 September 2018
David Clarke MLC – announced retirement September 2018
Scot MacDonald MLC – announced 12 November 2018

Nationals
Andrew Fraser MP (Coffs Harbour) – announced 14 June 2018
Thomas George MP (Lismore) – announced 30 June 2017
Troy Grant MP (Dubbo) – announced 12 July 2018
Kevin Humphries MP (Barwon) – announced 1 June 2017
Rick Colless MLC – did not nominate for endorsement

Shooters, Fishers and Farmers
Robert Brown MLC – lost preselection 5 February 2019

Date
The parliament has fixed four-year terms with the election held on the fourth Saturday in March, though the Governor may dissolve the house sooner on the advice of the Premier.

Key dates
Key dates for the election were: 
25 February: Lodgment of nominations opened
1 March: Legislative Assembly expired
4 March: Issue of Writs
6 March: Close of nominations
11 March: Early voting began
23 March: Election day (polls opened 8am to 6pm)
27 March: Last day for receipt of postal votes
3 April: Estimated Legislative Assembly declaration of results
12 April: Estimated Legislative Council declaration of results

Polling

Graphical summary

Voting intention

The ReachTEL poll on 10 September 2018 includes 5.9% of undecided voters.
The ReachTEL poll on 29 November 2018 includes 3.1% of undecided voters.
The YouGov-Galaxy poll on 28–29 November 2018 includes 5% of undecided voters.

Preferred Premier and satisfaction

Newspaper endorsements

Sunday editions 

The Sunday newspapers both endorsed the Liberal/National Party Coalition over the Labor Party.

The Sun-Herald described Berejiklian's Coalition Government as "solid and safe custodians, and—despite eight years in power and two relatively orderly leadership transitions—there is no particular sense that the Coalition has worn out its welcome". While highlighting her strengths in infrastructure and economic management, it warned that "the electorate tends to respond to a leader who can articulate a more uplifting vision". It contrasted this against Daley, where "questions linger over whether he and his team are ready to govern, partly because of how recently he was thrust into the job, partly because of past connections to tainted figures in the last Labor government and partly of his own making".

The Sunday Telegraph pointed out that despite having commenced many large scale infrastructure projects "the problem for the Government is that nothing is quite finished yet". Despite this, it singled out the Labor Opposition for not having "done enough to atone for the sins of its recent history" of corruption. It called for stability of leadership after a decade of instability, recommending to voters that they "should give the Government the opportunity to see through the transformation of our state".

Weekday editions
All four weekday newspapers endorsed the Liberal/National Party Coalition over the Labor Party.

Alternative newspapers
The Green Left Weekly endorsed Socialist Alliance. The Red Flag endorsed voting for both Socialist Alliance and the Greens.

See also

 Candidates of the 2019 New South Wales state election
 Politics of New South Wales
 Members of the New South Wales Legislative Assembly, 2015–2019
 Members of the New South Wales Legislative Council, 2015–2019

Notes

References

External links
NSW Electoral Commission: 2019 NSW State election
ABC Elections: 2019 New South Wales Election

Elections in New South Wales
New South Wales state election, 2019
2010s in New South Wales
March 2019 events in Australia
New South Wales Legislative Council